Beryozovka is a rural locality (a village) in Zubovsky Selsoviet, Ufimsky District, Bashkortostan, Russia. The population was 115 as of 2010. There is 1 street.

Geography 
Beryozovka is located 22 km southwest of Ufa (the district's administrative centre) by road. Nizhegorodka is the nearest rural locality.

References 

Rural localities in Ufimsky District